Anjangarh is a 1948 Bollywood drama film, directed by Bimal Roy. It stars Sunanda Bannerjee, Tulsi Chakraborty, Raja Ganguly, Hiralal, and Bipin Gupta. Dialogues were written by M Bajpayee.

Cast
 Sunanda Bannerjee, 
 Tulsi Chakraborty, 
 Parul Kar, 
 Manorama Jr.   
 Chhabi Roy,
 Bipin Gupta, 
 Asit Sen,
 Purnendu Mukherjee, 
 Jahar Roy, 
 Sunil Dasgupta,
 Prafulla Mukherjee,
 Ramakrishna Chatterjee, 
 Devi Mukherjee[B], 
 Amita Basu[B], 
 Phalguni Roy[B],
 Shankar Sen[B], 
 Raja Ganguly[B], 
 Kalipada Sarkar[B], 
 Bhanu Bannerjee[B], 
 Manoranjan Bhattacharya[B], 
 Rama Nehru[H], 
 Hirabai[H], 
 Hiralal[H], 
 Ajay Kumar[H],
 Raimohan[H], 
 Bhupendra Kapoor[H]

References

External links
 

1948 films
1940s Hindi-language films
Indian drama films